Diderma is a genus of slime molds in the family Didymiaceae. The genus was first described by Christiaan Hendrik Persoon in 1794, and the type species is Diderma globosum.

The genus contains over 200 taxa, and includes:

 Diderma stellulum 
 Diderma subasteroides

 Diderma cinereum
 Diderma effusum
  Diderma floriforme
Diderma globosum 
  Diderma testaceum 
  Diderma umbilicatum

References

Amoebozoa genera
Myxogastria
Taxa described in 1794
Taxa named by Christiaan Hendrik Persoon